Greg Taube (born 18 April 1938) is a former Australian rules footballer who played with South Melbourne in the Victorian Football League (VFL). He transferred to Williamstown in 1961 and played 73 games and kicked 2 goals up until the end of 1964. He played in the losing 1961 VFA grand final against Yarraville, and was judged equal best first-year player the same season. He finished in third place in the 1963 Club best and fairest award.

Notes

External links 

Greg Taube's playing statistics from The VFA Project

Living people
1938 births
Australian rules footballers from Victoria (Australia)
Sydney Swans players
Spotswood Football Club players
Williamstown Football Club players